KSS-1 may stand for:
 Korean Attack Submarine program, first phase of a project to build up the ROK Navy's submarine forces.
 Type 209 submarine (Chang Bogo class), submarine design chosen under the first phase (KSS-1) of the Korean Attack Submarine program.